No. 137 Squadron RAF existed briefly as a day bomber unit in World War I but never became operational. During World War II it flew as one of the two Whirlwind squadrons before converting to Hurricane Mk.IV fighter-bombers and later the Hawker Typhoon in the same role. The squadron was disbanded in August 1945.

History

Formation and World War I 
No. 137 Squadron RAF existed briefly as a unit working up to be a day bomber unit on Airco DH.9s during World War I, but it never became operational. It was formed at Shawbury on 1 April 1918 and was disbanded there on 4 July 1918, together with 12 other such units. Plans to reinstate the squadron in September as laid out in Air Organisation Memorandum 939 of 13 July 1918 came to nought as Air Organisation Memorandum 999 of 17 August 1918 cancelled these.

Second World War 

The squadron was reformed at Charmy Down on 20 September 1941 and equipped with the then brand new two-engined Westland Whirlwind four-cannon fighter. The squadron became operational with them on 20 October and flew its first mission (a mandolin) four days afterwards. Unfortunately the new CO, S/Ldr Sample, was killed four days after this in a mid-air collision with a new pilot. Two days later another pilot crashed into the sea. After this bad start, No. 137 became non-operational for a period before resuming with coastal missions on 11 November. On one such mission on 12 February 1942, to escort some destroyers, they met by accident the fighter screen around the Scharnhorst and the Gneisenau, losing four pilots in the event.

In June 1943 the by now worn-out Whirlwinds were replaced with Hurricane Mk.IV fighter-bombers and in July the squadron flew operationally with them again until February 1944 when the Hurricane was exchanged for the more modern and higher performance Hawker Typhoon. 137 flew this new fighter-bomber operationally from 8 February 1944 until 25 August 1945, when it was disbanded at RAF Warmwell by being renumbered to 174 Squadron.

Organisation

Commanding officers

Squadron Bases

See also 
 List of Royal Air Force aircraft squadrons

References

Notes

Bibliography 

 Bowyer, Michael J.F. and John D.R. Rawlings. Squadron Codes, 1937–56. Cambridge, UK: Patrick Stephens Ltd., 1979. .
 Flintham, Vic and Andrew Thomas. Combat Codes: A full explanation and listing of British, Commonwealth and Allied air force unit codes since 1938. Shrewsbury, Shropshire, UK: Airlife Publishing Ltd., 2003. .
 Halley, James J. The Squadrons of the Royal Air Force & Commonwealth 1918–1988. Tonbridge, Kent, UK: Air Britain (Historians) Ltd., 1988. .
 Jefford, C.G. RAF Squadrons, a Comprehensive record of the Movement and Equipment of all RAF Squadrons and their Antecedents since 1912. Shrewsbury, Shropshire, UK: Airlife Publishing, 1988 (second edition 2001). .
 Rawlings, John D.R. Fighter Squadrons of the RAF and their Aircraft. London: Macdonald and Jane's Publishers Ltd., 1969 (2nd edition 1976, reprinted 1978). .

External links

External links 
 History of squadron at RAF.mod.uk
 RAFWeb – Air of Authority

137 Squadron